Hengzhou may refer to:

Hengzhou (横州市), a city in Nanning, Guangxi, China
Hengzhou, Hebei (恒州镇), a town in Quyang County, Hebei, China
Roman Catholic Diocese of Hengzhou, in the ecclesiastical province of Changsha in China

Historical prefectures
Heng Prefecture (Guangxi) (橫州)
Heng Prefecture (Hunan) (衡州)

See also
Heng (disambiguation)